The following is a list of political parties in Ontario, Canada.

Parties represented in the Legislative Assembly of Ontario

Other parties registered with Elections Ontario

Parties listed in the order they are alphabetized by Elections Ontario.

Unregistered parties
 League for Socialist Action
 North American Labour Party
 Ontario Humanist Party
 Socialist Party of Ontario

Historical parties that held seats in the Legislative Assembly
 Co-operative Commonwealth Federation (first election 1934) 1932–1961
 (Independent) Labour 1874-1937
 Labor-Progressive Party 1941-1959
 Liberal-Labour 1943-1970s
 Liberal-Progressive 1934-1940
 Soldier 1919-1923
 Patrons of Industry 1894
 Protestant Protective Association 1894
 United Farmers of Ontario 1918-1940

Pre-Confederation parties
 Clear Grits (pre-Confederation)
 Reform Party (pre-Confederation)
 Family Compact (pre-1837 ruling clique)

Other historical parties

Toronto municipal parties

See also
List of Ontario general elections
Elections Ontario

References

 
Parties
Ontario

fr:Partis politiques canadiens#Ontario